This is a list of defunct airlines of Portugal.

See also

 List of airlines of Portugal
 List of airports in Portugal

References

Portugal
Airlines
Airlines, defunct